Melaleuca johnsonii is a plant in the myrtle family, Myrtaceae and is endemic to the south of Western Australia. It is similar to Melaleuca thapsina with its cylindrical leaves with prickly tips and usually yellow heads of flowers but is distinguished from it by its shorter leaves and papery sepals.

Description

The flowers are usually yellow, sometimes creamy-white and occasionally pink. They are arranged in heads on the ends of branches which continue to grow after flowering and sometimes also in the upper leaf axils. There are five bundles of stamens around the flower, each with 3 to 5 stamens.

Taxonomy and naming
The specific epithet (johnsonii) honours Lawrence Alexander Sidney Johnson, an Australian taxonomist.

Distribution and habitat
Melaleuca johnsonii occurs in and between the Hyden, Marvel Loch, Norseman, Newdegate and Esperance districts in the Avon Wheatbelt, Coolgardie, Esperance Plains and Mallee biogeographic regions. It grows in gravelly sand and claypans.

Conservation status
Melaleuca johnsonii is listed as "not threatened" by the Government of Western Australia Department of Parks and Wildlife.

References

johnsonii
Plants described in 1999
Endemic flora of Western Australia
Taxa named by Lyndley Craven